Abdullah Gül University (AGU) is a public university, supported by a philanthropic foundation (AGUV), located in Kayseri, Turkey.

The university, which was inaugurated in 2010, has 5 schools offering 12 undergraduate and 11 (6 B.Sc & 5 PhD) graduate programs. All courses at AGU are taught in English.

AGU first opened its gates to students for the 2013-2014 academic year.
 
Currently the university's main location is Sümer Campus, which covers 280.000 m², but the university has also started the development of a second campus, Mimar Sinan Campus, which will be outside the city center and with a planned total area of 360.000m².

History
The first steps towards founding Abdullah Gul University were taken in 2007, by the Kayseri City Council and other city notables. The aim was to raise the profile of education in Kayseri in line with the city's own vision of its development.
 
The University was named after the prominent Kayseri citizen and 11th president of the Turkish Republic, Abdullah Gül and was formally inaugurated on July 21, 2010.

The university's first campus was established on the former site of Turkey's first industrial complex. In the future, the university will also open a second campus, known as Mimar Sinan.

Campus

Sümer Campus 
AGU's current campus was built inside a former textile factory and currently covers 280.000 m². It is located ten minutes from the Kayseri city center and also offers student housing within its “Student Village”. 
The campus was recently expanded with the opening of its new Steel Building.

Mimar Sinan Campus 
AGU has started the construction of Mimar Sinan Campus (named after famous Kayserian architect Mimar Sinan), 14 km from Kayseri city center. Once finished it will become the university's main campus and an AGU shuttle system will connect it to the city center. It is also planned that in future a branch of the city's tramway, the Kayseray, which already connects the city center from east to west, will pass through the campus. The total area planned for this future campus is of more than 360.000 m² (with 2/3 reserved for green spaces and forests).

Academics

The Abdullah Gül University currently has 12 B.Sc, 6 M.Sc & 5 PhD programs organized into 5 schools:
 School of Engineering: Computer Engineering (B.Sc), Civil Engineering (B.Sc), Electrical & Electronics Engineering (B.Sc), Industrial Engineering (B.Sc), Mechanical Engineering (B.Sc), Advanced Materials and Nanotechnology (M.Sc), Materials Science and Mechanical Engineering (PhD), Electrical and Computer Engineering (M.Sc and PhD), Industrial Engineering (M.Sc and PhD), Sustainable Urban Infrastructure Engineering (M.Sc)
 School of Architecture: Architecture (B.Sc, M.Sc & PhD)
 School of Leadership and Management: Business Administration (B.Sc), Economy (B.Sc)
 School of Life and Natural Sciences: Molecular Biology and Genetic (B.Sc), Bioengineering (B.Sc, M.Sc & PhD)
 School of Humanities and Social Sciences: Political Science and Public Administration (B.Sc), Psychology (B.Sc)
 AGU School of Languages (AGUSL): new AGU students whose English proficiency is not sufficient to enroll at the Faculty level have the opportunity to complete AGUSL's one-year English preparatory program before joining their Faculty courses. The AGUSL also offers all students the opportunity to gain some familiarity with a second foreign language that has world significance.

Centers and Institutes
 AGU Academy: The Center for Continuing Education. AGU Academy offers training and international certification services for various age groups. Business owners and their employees in Kayseri are offered continuous training in the areas of Management, Financial Literacy, Marketing and Human Resources. Via the AGU Academy, the Abdullah Gül University is a certified SAT Test Center.
 AGU Children's University: Center for Gifted Children. The Children's University offers training courses and extra-curricular activities to gifted children from various age groups in the objective of developing their talents and potential.
 Research and Development Office. In partnership with Kayseri Tekno Park and the Technology Transfer Office (TTO), the AGU Research, Development and Innovation Office at AGU offers services to researchers to write proposals, find research partners and prepare project applications for funding. It also organizes information and training sessions for researchers to raise awareness about funds, support programs, intellectual property rights and entrepreneurship.
 Center for Learning & Teaching (CeLT). The center follows the ever-changing educational model processes with the developing world, supports the academic activities, implements educational models that will enable faculty members and research assistants to transfer information, and also shares the results with higher education institutions and stakeholders by integrating educational activities with research functions.

International Events

On April 28–30, 2014, AGU hosted the first International Plasma Technologies Congress (PLASMATECH 2014), which brought together researchers and practitioners from around the world on the subject of plasma technologies and their applications.

In June 2014, AGU also hosted the first International Symposium on Youth Employment Challenges (ISYEC), with the partnerships of the Turkish Ministry of Youth and Sports, the Ministry of EU and SALTO Euromed Resource Center, in order to bring together representatives from the educational (formal and non-formal), private and public sectors in order to work on cross-sectorial cooperation for the future of youth employment.

On October 18–22, 2014, AGU hosted the International Workshop “Cultural Heritage on the Road: the caravanserais of Turkey”, which attracted scholars and students from 8 different countries.  The objective of this event was to represent a fundamental assessment of the research on caravanserais by taking stock of the studies and of the restoration and preservation work that has been conducted in the last decades on the caravanserais of Turkey.

References

External links
Official website (English)
AGU International Office page
Official University Brochure
Artificial Intelligence (AI) research group at AGU

Educational institutions established in 2010
Abdullah Gül University
2010 establishments in Turkey
Education in Kayseri
Buildings and structures in Kayseri